Kizu Station may refer to:
 Kizu Station (Kyoto), a railway station in Kizugawa, Kyoto, Japan
 Kizu Station (Hyōgo), a railway station in Kobe, Japan